The 2023 Horizon League Men's Basketball Tournament was the final event of the 2022–23 men's basketball season for the Horizon League. It began on February 28, 2023, and ended on March 7; first-round and quarterfinal games were played at the home courts of the higher seeds, with all remaining games at Indiana Farmers Coliseum in Indianapolis. The winner, Northern Kentucky, received the conference's automatic berth into the NCAA Tournament.

Seeds 
All of the teams will participate in the tournament with the top-five teams receiving byes to the quarterfinals.

Schedule

Bracket 
The Horizon League does not use a fixed bracket tournament system, and pairings are re-seeded after the first and second rounds.

* denotes overtime period

References 

Tournament
Horizon League men's basketball tournament
Basketball competitions in Indianapolis
College sports in Indiana
Horizon League men's basketball tournament
Horizon League men's basketball tournament